Manuchar I Dadiani (died 1611) was Prince of Mingrelia, of the House of Dadiani, from 1590 until his death. A younger son of Levan I Dadiani, he succeeded on the death of his elder brother, Mamia IV Dadiani.

Manuchar ruled over Mingrelia, in western Georgia, in a period of continuous anarchy in the successor states of the former kingdom of Georgia. Manuchar continued his predecessors' efforts to extend the Dadiani's influence over the kingdom of Imereti, Mingrelia's nominal suzerain. He fought off an invasion led by King Simon I of Kartli, who sought to reunite all of Georgia under his aegis, and secured his protégé Rostom on the throne of Imereti, thereby briefly restoring relative peace in western Georgia. Manuchar died in a hunting accident and was succeeded by his son, Levan II Dadiani.

Career 
Manuchar Dadiani was a younger son of Levan I Dadiani, Prince of Mingrelia. The date of his birth is unknown. He succeeded on the death of elder brother, Mamia IV Dadiani, in 1590. That same year, Simon I, king of Kingdom of Kartli in eastern Georgia, took advantage of instability in western Georgia and renewed his efforts to bring the Kingdom of Imereti under his control. He led his army, equipped with artillery, over the Likhi mountains into Imereti and forced its king Rostom, the Dadiani's nominee, into flight to Mingrelia. Dadiani offered to reinstate Rostom on terms of vassalage and himself promised peace and submission to Simon. The king of Kartli, however, insisted on Rostom being surrendered; else, he threatened to attack Mingrelia.   

Manuchar responded with mobilization and, accompanied by Rostom and his loyalists, attacked Simon at Opshkviti, defeated him and captured his cannons. Simon fled to Kartli, while Rostom was restored in Imereti under Dadiani's protection. The two kings eventually reconciled and peace was reestablished, for the time being, in western Georgia. According to the 18th-century historian Prince Vakhushti, Manuchar died in a hunting incident, while pursuing a herd of deer, in 1611. He was succeeded by his son, Levan II Dadiani.

Family  
Manuchar Dadiani was married twice. In 1590 he married Nestan-Darejan (died 1591), daughter of Alexander II of Kakheti. She died while giving birth to a son, Levan, in 1591. In 1592, Manuchar married his second wife Tamar (born 1561), daughter of Atabag Kaikhosro II Jaqeli, Prince of Samtskhe and widow of the nobleman Kaikhosro Oravzhandashvili and of Vakhtang I Gurieli, Prince of Guria.

Manuchar had two sons and three daughters:
 Levan II Dadiani (1591–1657), Prince of Mingrelia from 1611 to 1657;
 Anonymous daughter, whom his brother, Levan, married off, in 1634, into the harem of the shah of Persia; 
 Anonymous daughter, who served as a nun at Martvili in 1640;
 Iese or Ioseb, who was blinded by his enemies; he was the father of Levan III Dadiani and, according to the historian Cyril Toumanoff's assumption, of two other sons, Mamuka and Liparit III Dadiani. The latter, according to Prince Vakhushti, was a son of Manuchar I and his wife Tamar Jaqeli.
 Mariam (died 1682), who was married three times, successively to Simon I Gurieli, Prince of Guria, King Rostom of Kartli, and the latter's adopted son and successor, King Vakhtang V of Kartli.

References 

1611 deaths
House of Dadiani
16th-century people from Georgia (country)
17th-century people from Georgia (country)
Hunting accident deaths
Accidental deaths in Georgia (country)